, also known by her stage name , was a Japanese voice actress. Inoue was diagnosed with lung cancer in late 2001, underwent treatments during 2002, and her condition deteriorated rapidly in the last month of her life.

At the time of her death she was represented by the Tokyo Actor's Consumer's Cooperative Society. She had previously been represented by Production Baobab, Office Osawa, and others. Her role as Bakura in Yu-Gi-Oh! Duel Monsters was replaced by Rika Matsumoto.

Selected filmography
Urusei Yatsura (Ran (First Voice))
Osomatsu-kun 1988 (Osomatsu)
Mobile Suit Gundam (Sayla Mass, Kikka Kitamoto, Haro, Pero)
Mobile Suit Gundam ZZ (Sayla Mass)
Mobile Police Patlabor (Kanuka Clancy)
Baoh (Sophine)
Soreike! Anpanman (Tendon Ka-san, Kurobe)
Time Bokan series
Yatterman (Chiro, Himeko, Keroppa)
Yattodetaman (Aladdin, Jack)
Itadakiman (Oscar, Sam)
Space Runaway Ideon (Sheryl Formosa, Lou Piper)
Tōshō Daimos (Kairo)
High School! Kimengumi (Jako Amano)
Macross 7 (Gepelnich)
Invincible Steel Man Daitarn 3 (Reika Sanjou)
Yu-Gi-Oh! Duel Monsters (Ryo Bakura (Episodes 12–41))
YuYu Hakusho (Shorin, Rando)Ranma ½ (Rinko)Magic User's Club (Akiko Aburatsubo)Gatchaman II (Paimer)Tenchi Muyo! Manatsu no Eve (Yuzuha)Fatal Fury: The Motion Picture (Panni Shona (Athena Asamiya's half-sister))Domain of Murder (Mama)

DubbingMy Lucky Stars, Barbara Woo / Swordflower / Lo Hon Gwo (Sibelle Hu)Top Gun'' (1989 Fuji TV edition), Carole Bradshaw (Meg Ryan)

References

External links
https://web.archive.org/web/20051128183331/http://www.west.net/~ke6jqp/YouInoue/youinoue.htm
 
  Obituary from Newtype USA

1946 births
2003 deaths
Voice actresses from Tokyo
Japanese video game actresses
Japanese voice actresses
Deaths from lung cancer in Japan
20th-century Japanese actresses
21st-century Japanese actresses
Tokyo Actor's Consumer's Cooperative Society voice actors
Production Baobab voice actors